Bernard Morton Kopell (born June 21, 1933) is an American character actor known for his roles as Siegfried in Get Smart from 1966 to 1969 and as Dr. Adam Bricker ("Doc") on The Love Boat from 1977 to 1986.

Early beginnings
Kopell was born in Brooklyn, New York, the son of Pauline (née Taran) and Al Bernard Kopell of Jewish extraction. Kopell attended Erasmus Hall High School in Brooklyn before enrolling at New York University, majoring in dramatic arts and graduating with a bachelor of fine arts in 1955.

During his time on the USS Iowa, he travelled extensively to Europe in Italy, Spain, Greece, the Middle East in Turkey as well as to South America. He also taught the GED to other military personnel. After completing active duty, Kopell returned to New York before going to Los Angeles with the promise of an agent by fellow graduate James Drury.

Career
In Los Angeles, Kopell initially drove a taxi and tried to sell Kirby vacuum cleaners to make ends meet before being cast in a minor role in The Brighter Day, a daytime soap aired on CBS. From there, he moved on to star in My Favorite Martian and The Jack Benny Program impersonating Latino characters, eventually managing to branch out and do other accents.

During the 1960s and early 1970s, Kopell appeared in many television series, often sitcoms, including Ripcord, That Girl, The Jack Benny Program, Our Man Higgins, Green Acres, Ben Casey, The Flying Nun, Needles And Pins, McHale's Navy, Lancelot Link-Secret Chimp, Petticoat Junction, The Streets of San Francisco, Room 222, The Mary Tyler Moore Show, The Dick Van Dyke Show, Bewitched, and Kojak.

However, Kopell's longest-running role was as Dr. Adam Bricker on The Love Boat, an Aaron Spelling production. He remained on the series during its entire run, appearing in 250 episodes.

Siegfried and other roles
Kopell made memorable recurring appearances as KAOS agent Siegfried in Get Smart, Alan-a-Dale in When Things Were Rotten, Jerry Bauman in That Girl and Louie Pallucci in The Doris Day Show. He played several characters on Bewitched, including the witches' apothecary and the hippie warlock Alonzo in the episode "The Warlock in the Gray Flannel Suit". He played Charlie Miller as a member of the cast of the situation comedy Needles and Pins, which ran for 14 episodes in the autumn of 1973. He portrayed a plastic surgeon who gave Ed Brown a facelift on Chico and the Man. Earlier in his career, he played a director in an episode of Alfred Hitchcock Presents ("Good-Bye George"). About this same time, he guest starred on the short-lived The New Phil Silvers Show.

Doc on The Love Boat and other roles
Kopell's role as Doc on The Love Boat was parodied in a humorous appearance on Late Show with David Letterman in 1995. Two entries in that night's Top Ten List poked fun at The Love Boat, and at the Doc character specifically. The camera cut to Kopell, who was sitting in the audience, and he stormed out of the theater. A few moments later, he was shown having been re-seated in the mezzanine when the second parody was made at his expense, and again stood up, raised his fists and stormed out, playing along with the host. In a dream sequence of The Fresh Prince of Bel-Air, Kopell made a parody cameo as an actor who played a ship's doctor so many times he offers to perform an operation for real, while in a 1994 episode of Saturday Night Live he appeared as Doc during a Love Boat-themed spoof of Star Trek: The Next Generation. In the 1990s, Kopell traded on his Doc Bricker persona when he appeared in a commercial for an anti-snoring product named D-Snore, in which he noted that loud snoring "can even ruin a romantic cruise."

After The Love Boat, Kopell was so recognizable that he was not in roles often without a nod to his most famous role. He appears as a coroner in "Which Prue Is It Anyway", an episode of Charmed. Kopell appears in the Monk episode "Mr. Monk and the Critic", playing Mr. Gilson, the ill-fated restroom attendant, whom Monk referred to as the Michelangelo of lavatories. He guest starred in "Pinky", a 2009 episode of My Name Is Earl. He made a cameo as a patient in the Scrubs episode "My Friend the Doctor", as well as an episode of The Suite Life of Zack & Cody.

Personal life
Kopell has been married three times, first to actress Celia Whitney, then actress Yolanda Veloz, before marrying Catrina Honadle in 1997. Kopell and Honadle have two children together, Adam (born 1998) and Josh (born 2003).

Filmography

Film

Television

Writer

References

External links

 
 
 

1933 births
Living people
20th-century American Jews
American male television actors
American male stage actors
Male actors from New York City
Male actors from Los Angeles
Military personnel from New York City
People from Brooklyn
20th-century American male actors
21st-century American male actors
Erasmus Hall High School alumni
United States Navy sailors
21st-century American Jews